Zeyyat Selimoğlu (Istanbul, March 31, 1922- ibidem, July 1, 2000) was a Turkish writer and translator.

He studied at the Deutsche Schule Istanbul and at the Istanbul University Faculty of Law.

He translated Heinrich Böll, Friedrich Dürrenmatt or Johann Wolfgang von Goethe to Turkish language.

Awards
 1970: Sait Faik Hikâye Armağanı

Partial bibliography 
 Koca Denizde İki Nokta (1973)
 Karaya Vurdu Deniz (1975)
 Yavru Kayık (1979)
 Derin Dondurucu İçin Öykü (1995)

References

1922 births
2000 deaths
Writers from Istanbul
20th-century Turkish writers
Deutsche Schule Istanbul alumni
Istanbul University Faculty of Law alumni
20th-century translators
Translators of Johann Wolfgang von Goethe